SL-11 may refer to:

Schütte-Lanz SL 11, a German military dirigible
Karosa ŠL 11, a Czech intercity bus, produced from 1970-1981
Tsyklon-2, a Soviet and Russian rocket, used from 1969-2006
Tsyklon, a Soviet rocket, used from 1967-1969